The Council of Catholic Patriarchs of the Orient (French: Conseil des Patriarches Catholiques d'Orient, CPCO) is an agency of the Catholic Church that meets the patriarchs of Eastern Catholic Churches and the Latin Patriarch of Jerusalem.
Permanent seat of the organisation is the Maronite Catholic Patriarchate of Antioch in Bkerke, Lebanon.

Nature and objectives

The nature of the Conference has to be a sign and instrument of patriarchal collegiality and communion between the Eastern Catholic Churches and the universal Church.
It aims to:
 reflect on and promote the Christian life in the Middle East
 coordinate pastoral activity, said the future of Christianity in those lands, and strengthen ties among the faithful to the homeland and the diaspora
 promote ecumenical and interreligious dialogue
 ensure the active participation of Catholics in the Council of Churches of the Middle East
 promote peace, development, respect for the rights of man and woman.

History

19-24 August 1991: I Annual Conference in Bikfaya in Lebanon

1992: Second Annual Congress at Coptic Patriarchal Seminary, Egypt

1993: Third Annual Conference for Latin bishopric in Amman, Jordan

19-24 September 1994: Fourth Annual Conference at the Melkite patriarchal residence in Raboueh, Lebanon 

4-11 September 1995: Fifth Annual Conference on Armenian Catholic Patriarchate in Bzoummar near Beirut

13-18 October 1996: Sixth Annual Conference at the patriarchal residence in Syriac Convent of Our Lady of Deliverance in Sharfeh, Lebanon

19-25 October 1997: Seventh Annual Conference in Alexandria, Egypt

11-16 October 1998: Eighth Annual Conference in Amman, Jordan

3-6 November 1999: Ninth Annual Conference at the Maronite Patriarchate in Bkerke: Pastoral Letter of Catholic Patriarchs of the East on the movement œcuménique

16-20 October 2000: Tenth Annual Conference on Armenian Catholic Patriarchate in Bzoummar

23-27 September 2001: Eleventh Annual Conference at the patriarchal residence in Syriac Convent of Our Lady of Deliverance in Sharfeh, Lebanon

16-20 October 2006: XVI Annual Conference at the Armenian Catholic Patriarchate in Bzoummar, Lebanon

15-19 October 2007: XVII Annual Conference at the summer Melkite patriarchal residence in Ain Traz, near Beirut

25-29 November 2019: Cairo, Egypt, where they met the President of Egypt Abdel Fattah el-Sisi and Coptic Orthodox Pope Tawadros II of Alexandria.

Composition

In 2012, the conference was composed of:
 Antonios Naguib, Patriarch of Alexandria of the Coptic Catholic Church
 Béchara Boutros Raï, Patriarch of Antioch of the Maronite Church
 Gregory III Laham, Patriarch of Antioch of the Melkite Greek Catholic Church
 Ignace Joseph III Younan, Patriarch of Antioch of the Syriac Catholic Church
 Emmanuel III Delly, Patriarch of Babylon of the Chaldean Catholic Church
 Nerses Bedros XIX Tarmouni, Patriarch of Cilicia of the Armenian Catholic Church
 Fouad Twal, Latin Patriarch of Jerusalem

References

1991 in Christianity

Catholic Church in Asia
Keserwan District